

Avtek was a U.S. aircraft manufacturer established at Camarillo, California in 1982 by Robert Adickes, Robert Honeycutt and Quinten Ward with the intention of producing a business aircraft of composite construction, the Avtek 400. Foreign investment was obtained from firms in Denmark, Finland, Germany, and Japan.

In 1991, a European subsidiary, EuroAvtek was formed, jointly owned by Avtek, Per Udsen, and the government of Denmark, to oversee sales and marketing on the continent. Avtek filed for bankruptcy in 1998 without achieving type certification for the prototype. Its assets were purchased by Ward personally, who then formed the AvtekAir corporation to continue development.

References
 
 AvtekAir company website

Defunct aircraft manufacturers of the United States
Companies based in Ventura County, California
Companies established in 1982
1982 establishments in California